Khalaki (also Romanized as Khālakī; also known as Khālak and Khel’ki) is a village in Luleman Rural District, Kuchesfahan District, Rasht County, Gilan Province, Iran. At the 2006 census, its population was 268, in 95 families.

References 

Populated places in Rasht County